Democracy and Security is a peer-reviewed academic journal covering national security and democracy published by Routledge. Founded in 2005, editors Leonard Weinberg and Gabriel Ben Dor wrote that the journal covers issues about democracies responding to threats.

References

External links 
 

Publications established in 2005
English-language journals
Political science journals